Salahuddin is a Pakistani politician who has been a member of the National Assembly of Pakistan from Hyderabad since August 2018. Previously he was a member of the National Assembly from 2008 to 2013.

Political career
He was elected to the National Assembly of Pakistan from Constituency NA-220 (Hyderabad-II) as a candidate of Muttahida Qaumi Movement (MQM) in 2008 Pakistani general election. He received 147,040 votes and defeated Irfan Qureshi, a candidate of Pakistan Peoples Party (PPP).

He was re-elected to the National Assembly as a candidate of MQM from Constituency NA-227 (Hyderabad-III) in 2018 Pakistani general election.

References

Living people
Pakistani MNAs 2008–2013
Muttahida Qaumi Movement MNAs
Pakistani MNAs 2018–2023
Year of birth missing (living people)